Jack Starr's Burning Starr is an American heavy metal band from New York City, formed in 1984. The band was founded and guided by former Virgin Steele guitarist Jack Starr and enjoyed limited success in the US during the explosion of hair metal in the second half of the 1980s. Burning Starr released four studio albums before disbanding, with Starr going to work in other short-living formations. The band was resurrected by Starr in 2008 and signed with Magic Circle Music, playing in the Magic Circle Festival of 2008 and 2009. The band played at the 2013 Keep It True festival and recorded a DVD.

Line-up
 Jack Starr - guitars
 Alexx Panza - vocals
 Ned Meloni - bass
 Kenny "Rhino" Earl - drums

Discography

Albums 
 Rock the American Way (1985)
 No Turning Back (1986)
 Blaze of Glory (1987)
 Jack Starr's Burning Starr (1989)
 Defiance (2009)
 Land of the Dead (2011)
 Stand Your Ground (2017)
 Souls of the Innocent (2022)

Compilations
 Burning Starr (1998)

References

External links
 Jack Starr's Burning Starr Official Website
 Jack Starr's Burning Starr
 Jack Starr Official Website

Heavy metal musical groups from New York (state)
Musical groups established in 1984